Pulsatilla grandis, the greater pasque flower, is a species of flowering plant in the genus Pulsatilla of the family Ranunculaceae. It is a perennial plant that grows on calcium-rich soil in dry grasslands, in rocky outcrops, and in pine and oak forests. It flowers from February to April, in the time of the Easter (which gives it its name), with intensively blue to violet flowers. Its silk stalk is protected from the cold by velvety trichomes (hairs). Pulsatilla grandis is native to the countries of Central, Eastern and Southeastern Europe, and is particularly frequent in Hungary. In some of them, it is classed as threatened.

Slovenia
In Slovenia, Pulsatilla grandis (named , the Easter flower) is a rare and protected plant. It has four growing places in the country all of them are situated in the sub-Pannonian phytogeographical area in the northeastern part of Slovenia. The plant is the symbol of the Boč–Donatus Mountain Landscape Park. On a small rise near the Boč growing place, a stone sculpture of the flower, created by the sculptor Franc Tobias from Razvanje, has been put on display in the 2000s. Pulsatilla grandis is also depicted on the coat of arms of the Diocese of Celje.

References

External links

 Pulsatilla grandis: Species Range. Maps.iucnredlist.org.

grandis
Flora of Austria
Flora of Bosnia and Herzegovina
Flora of Croatia
Flora of the Czech Republic
Flora of Germany
Flora of Hungary
Flora of Moldova
Flora of Romania
Flora of Serbia
Flora of Slovakia
Flora of Slovenia
Flora of Ukraine